The 1999 NCAA Division III women's basketball tournament was the 18th annual tournament hosted by the NCAA to determine the national champion of Division III women's collegiate basketball in the United States.

Defending champions Washington University in St. Louis defeated St. Benedict in the championship game, 74–65, to claim the Bears' second Division III national title, their second of four consecutive.

The championship rounds were hosted by Western Connecticut State University in Danbury, Connecticut.

Bracket

Final Four

All-tournament team
 Tasha Rodgers, Washington University in St. Louis
 Alia Fischer, Washington University in St. Louis
 Molly Mark, St. Benedict
 Robyn Ruschmeier, St. Benedict
 Dee Jackson, Salem State

See also
 1999 NCAA Division I women's basketball tournament
 1999 NCAA Division II women's basketball tournament
 1999 NAIA Division I women's basketball tournament
 1999 NAIA Division II women's basketball tournament
 1999 NCAA Division III men's basketball tournament

References

 
NCAA Division III women's basketball tournament
1999 in sports in Connecticut
Washington University Bears
Salem State Vikings